Princess Daisy is a 1983 American television miniseries directed by Waris Hussein, based on the 1980 novel of the same name by Judith Krantz.

Plot
Princess Daisy tells the story of a young girl who is sent to England to live with her father, Prince Valensky, after her mother's death in a car crash. Unfortunately, Daisy is immediately separated from her twin sister Dani, who is a special needs child not accepted by their father. When Daisy turns 16, their father dies in a plane accident. The girl is forced to take care of her life herself, especially when her half-brother starts seeing in her more than just a sister.

Cast
 Merete Van Kamp .... Daisy & Dani Valensky
 Lindsay Wagner .... Francesca Valensky
 Stacy Keach .... Prince Alexander "Stash" Valensky
 Claudia Cardinale ....  Anabelle de Fourdemont Valensky
 Robert Urich .... Patrick Shannon
 Paul Michael Glaser .... Fred North
 Rupert Everett ....  Ram Valensky
 Ringo Starr ....  Robin Valerian
 Barbara Bach .... Vanessa Valerian
 Nicolas Coster .... Matty Firestone
 Rachel & Melissa Dennis .... young Daisy & Dani
Alexa Kenin .... Kiki Kavanaugh

Critical reception
Richard Corliss wrote of the miniseries, "Not even trash can guarantee the happy ending, and, alas, it happened to Jane Doe: Princess Daisy proved a small screen bust." However, The Guardian was more positive; while it criticized the acting, it concluded, "Despite all that, Princess Daisy is much better quality kitsch than Lace. It has all the same, essential mini-series requirements: vulgar opulence, beautiful people, international locations, the lot. But it also has a strong, closely packed story line, with the kind of fairy tale elements—the mirror image twin, the evil step-relation—that can remind you of childhood frissons; and it has characters in place of those perambulating coat hangers we had last week. And if we customers don't take the trouble to distinguish between good and bad rubbish, you know exactly what kind we will get in future."

References

External links

1983 television films
1983 films
1980s American television miniseries
Films directed by Waris Hussein
Films scored by Lalo Schifrin
NBC network original films
Adaptations of works by Judith Krantz